Shyam Rangeela (born Shyam Sunder on 25 August 1994), often credited as Rangeela (which literally means colourful), is an Indian comedian. He is a member of Aam Aadmi Party.

Early life
Shyam Rangeela was born on 25 August 1994 in the village of Manaktheri of Pilibanga town of Hanumangarh in the Indian state of Rajasthan. His father, Jawahar Lal is a farmer. He left this village in 2013 and moved to a new village. Rangeela's family presently lives in Mokamawala village of Raisinghnagar town of Sri Ganganagar. He belongs to a Hindu family.

Shyam's education till eighth grade took place in the village of Manaktheri, then till the twelfth in Suratgarh. After that, he did an animation course in Jaipur from 2012–15.

Shyam dreamed of becoming a comedian in childhood.

Career
Rangeela gained attention when he performed in The Great Indian Laughter Challenge, mimicking Prime Minister Narendra Modi and Congress President Rahul Gandhi, receiving a standing ovation from the judge Akshay Kumar, although it never aired. Prior to that, he had performed in an institute at Jaipur and imitated those politicians.

References

Living people
Indian male comedians
1995 births

Joining AAP 
Rangeela joined the Aam Aadmi Party on 4 May 2022, after sharing a series of tweets stating how TV shows were rejecting him repeatedly because his comedy was 'too political'.